The women's 200 metres event at the 2021 European Athletics U23 Championships was held in Tallinn, Estonia, at Kadriorg Stadium on 9 and 10 July.

Records
Prior to the competition, the records were as follows:

Results

Round 1
Qualification rule: First 4 in each heat (Q) and the next 4 fastest (q) advance to the Semi-Finals.

Wind:Heat 1: +0.5 m/s, Heat 2: -0.4 m/s, Heat 3: -0.4 m/s, Heat 4: -0.6 m/s, Heat 5: +0.6 m/s

Semifinals
Qualification rule:  First 2 in each heat (Q) and the next 2 fastest (q) advance to the Final.

Wind:Heat 1: -1.3 m/s, Heat 2: -1.2 m/s, Heat 3: -0.7 m/s

Final

Wind: –0.4 m/s

References

200 metres
200 metres at the European Athletics U23 Championships